John Anthony Hopkins (born 16 June 1953) is a former Welsh cricketer who played for Glamorgan.

Hopkins was a right-handed batsman and part-time wicket-keeper. He first kept for Glamorgan at the age of 17 years and 68 days which was a record for the county and the Sunday League competition. With Eifion Jones commanding a regular place behind the stumps he was forced to concentrate on his batting and was soon opening the batting for Glamorgan. His highest score of 230 was made against Worcestershire at New Road.

His brother, Jeffris, also played first-class cricket.

External links
 

1953 births
Living people
Welsh cricketers
Glamorgan cricketers
Eastern Province cricketers
Marylebone Cricket Club cricketers
Wicket-keepers